Stevensius is a genus of beetles in the family Carabidae, containing the following species:

 Stevensius bidulus Deuve & Hodebert, 1991
 Stevensius brunneoides Deuve, 2001
 Stevensius brunneus Ueno, 1977
 Stevensius deharvengi Deuve, 1987
 Stevensius lampros Jeannel, 1923
 Stevensius minutus Ueno, 1997
 Stevensius smetanai Deuve, 1988
 Stevensius striatulus Ueno, 1973

References

Trechinae